Cherry Grove Township may refer to the following places in the United States:

 Cherry Grove Township, Michigan
 Cherry Grove Township, Goodhue County, Minnesota
 Cherry Grove Township, Warren County, Pennsylvania

See also
 Cherry Grove-Shannon Township, Carroll County, Illinois

Township name disambiguation pages